Tall Gah may refer to:
Tall Gah, Boyer-Ahmad (تل گه - Tall Gah)
Tall Gah, Dana (تل گاه - Tall Gāh)